Chadibe is a village in the Central District (Botswana) of Botswana. The population was 4,939 in 2011.

See also
 Mathangwane Village

References

Populated places in Central District (Botswana)
Villages in Botswana